This list of historical markers installed by the National Historical Commission of the Philippines (NHCP) in Mimaropa (Region IV-B) is an annotated list of people, places, or events in the region that have been commemorated by cast-iron plaques issued by the said commission. The plaques themselves are permanent signs installed in publicly visible locations on buildings, monuments, or in special locations.

While many Cultural Properties have historical markers installed, not all places marked with historical markers are designated into one of the particular categories of Cultural Properties.

Related to the discovered shipwrecks (Japanese ship Musashi) in Sibuyan Island, Romblon, a group has been pushing the transfer of the marker Labanan sa Karagatan ng Sibuyan (Battle of Sibuyan Sea) to the said island from the town of Alcantara.

This article lists thirty-nine (39) markers from the MIMAROPA Region.

Marinduque
This article lists fourteen (14) markers from the Province of Marinduque.

Occidental Mindoro
This article lists two (2) markers from the Province of Occidental Mindoro.

Oriental Mindoro
This article lists three (3) markers from the Province of Oriental Mindoro.

Palawan
This article lists sixteen (16) markers from the Province of Palawan.

Romblon
This article lists four (4) markers from the Province of Romblon.

See also
List of Cultural Properties of the Philippines in Mimaropa

References

Footnotes

Bibliography 

National Historical Institute (2008). Historical Markers (1992 - 2006). National Historical Institute.
A list of sites and structures with historical markers, as of 16 January 2012
A list of institutions with historical markers, as of 16 January 2012

External links
A list of sites and structures with historical markers, as of 16 January 2012
A list of institutions with historical markers, as of 16 January 2012
National Registry of Historic Sites and Structures in the Philippines
Policies on the Installation of Historical Markers

Mimaropa
Mimaropa